Avera may refer to:

Avera, Georgia, a city in Georgia, United States
Avera, Raiatea, a village on the island of Raiatea, French Polynesia
Avera, Rurutu, a village on the island of Rurutu, French Polynesia
Avera Health, a health care system in the US Midwest
Avera, a diminutive of the Russian male first name Averky
Avera Motors, now Rivian, makers of electric automobiles

See also
Avera and inward, feudal duties in England
Aveira or averah, a Hebrew word for transgression or sin